The New Opera House is a historic building in Auburn, Nebraska. It was built by William Dorrum in 1894 for the Auburn Building and Improvement Association. Over the years, it hosted many performances and political events, including speeches by Congressman/Senator Elmer Burkett as well as Governor George L. Sheldon. It has been listed on the National Register of Historic Places since September 28, 1988.

References

National Register of Historic Places in Nemaha County, Nebraska
Theatres completed in 1894
1894 establishments in Nebraska